Insomniac (formerly Insomniac Events) is an American electronic music event promoter and music distributor. Founded by Pasquale Rotella, it is the organizer of various music festivals, including its flagship electronic music festival Electric Daisy Carnival (EDC) in Las Vegas.

Alongside EDC, Insomniac runs the electronic music events Beyond Wonderland and Nocturnal Wonderland, as well as drum and bass and dubstep-oriented events under the brand Bassrush, hardstyle events under the brand Basscon, and trance events under the brand Dreamstate. The company also owns a stake in the Okeechobee Music & Arts Festival.

Insomniac is also involved in the operation of three Los Angeles nightclubs—Create (in partnership with SBE, built on the site of the former Vanguard Hollywood), Exchange L.A., and the underground warehouse Factory 93, located at 1756 Naud Street. It then acquired Miami's Club Space in 2019.

In 2014, Insomniac introduced a co-branded EDM record label known as Insomniac Records, initially in partnership with Interscope Geffen A&M. In 2018, Insomniac took its A&R and distribution operations in-house as Insomniac Music Group .

Overview and partnerships
Insomniac has been described as placing a larger emphasis on fan experiences over profits and ticket sales, with Rotella having argued that music festivals did not require "big acts who sell out arenas" (going as far as to praising Burning Man for being an "event by the people for the people" where "the organizers just provide an open space" and "people go all out").

In June 2013, Insomniac announced a number of partnerships, including one with Dick Clark Productions to produce a dance music awards show, and a "creative partnership" with Live Nation that would give Insomniac access to Live Nation's resources, while leaving them creative control over their events. While specifics of the deal were not revealed, Rotella emphasized the deal was not an acquisition.

In August 2015, Rotella announced his new radio show, Night Owl Radio, on SiriusXM's Electric Area. Electric Area was later replaced by Diplo's Revolution in 2018. In the summer of 2018, Insomniac Radio launched on SiriusXM. In May 2019, Insomniac partnered with Dash Radio as its flagship station. In June 2019, Insomniac acquired a controlling stake in Soundslinger, LLC, the organizer of the Okeechobee Music & Arts Festival. The event returned from a one-year hiatus in 2020 with a revamped production, carrying artistic aspects of other Insomniac festivals. In July 2019, Insomniac acquired a majority stake in Miami's Club Space nightclub.

In response to the COVID-19 pandemic (which resulted in the postponement of all of its in-person festivals), Insomniac began to stream a rotation of sets from previous editions of its festivals on its YouTube and Twitch channels under the "Insomniac Rewind" banner, and live "virtual" festivals. In late-2020, Insomniac began a residency of drive-in "Park 'N Rave" concerts at the NOS Events Center in San Bernardino, and announced a "drive-through audiovisual experience" event known as the "Electric Mile" at Santa Anita Park—featuring installations separated into "worlds" inspired by its main festival brands.

In February 2021, Insomniac announced a number of new brands, including Lost in Dreams—a record label and upcoming festival that will focus upon future bass and melodic dubstep, and a bass music event at The Vanguard known as Abduction.

In March 2022, Insomniac announced a partnership with Unity Technologies to develop a "persistent" online world for virtual concerts.

Insomniac Music Group

In May 2014, Insomniac announced the formation of Insomniac Records, an EDM record label created in partnership with Interscope Geffen A&M. The label aimed to attract both "undiscovered" and "established" producers. Arty was announced as the first artist to be signed to the label. Other artists such as Bingo Players and Chris Lake were also signed.

In December 2018, Insomniac announced the formation of Insomniac Music Group, which provides A&R and distribution services for its in-house imprints (which includes brand extensions of some of its festivals) and other electronic music labels. Alongside Insomniac Records, its imprints include:
Basscon Records
 Bassrush Records
 Discovery Project
 Dreamstate Records
 Gud Vibrations
 HARD Recordings
 In / Rotation
Lost in Dreams
What To Do

Events
 Audiotistic Music Festival
 Bassrush Massive 
 Bay Nites 
 Beyond Wonderland 
 Countdown 
 Crush (Southern California, San Francisco, Phoenix, Dallas) 
 Dreamstate 
 Electric Daisy Carnival (Las Vegas, Mexico, Orlando, and Portugal. UK, India, Puerto Rico, and Brazil discontinued)
 Electric Forest 
 Escape: Psycho Circus (formerly Escape From Wonderland)
 Forbidden Kingdom 
 Hard
 Holy Ship!
 Middlelands 
 Nocturnal Wonderland 
 Okeechobee Music & Arts Festival
 Project Z 
 We Are NRG

Inactive 

 Together as One 
 White Wonderland

Related media
 Electric Daisy Carnival (2000 album)
 Electric Daisy Carnival, Vol. 1 (2010 album)
 Electric Daisy Carnival Experience (2011 film)
 "Under the Electric Sky" (2013 film)

See also 
 SFX Entertainment

References

External links

Insomniac Records website

Event management companies of the United States
Electronic dance music
Electronic music event management companies